The 2017 Houston Texans season was the franchise's 16th season in the National Football League (NFL) and the fourth under head coach Bill O'Brien. With the Texans' loss at the Titans in Week 13, Houston exceeded their loss total (7) from 2014, 2015 and 2016. The Texans clinched their first losing season since 2013 (and their first under Bill O'Brien), and finished in last place in the AFC South for the first time since 2013.

The team were with high hopes with Deshaun Watson as their starting quarterback who broke rookie records in his starts. However, after a loss in Week 8, Watson tore his ACL during practice that ruled him out for the rest of the season. The team was forced to turn to backup Tom Savage to replace Watson. Savage could not fill the void and the Texans limped to a 4–12 finish, tied for second-worst in the AFC standings with the Indianapolis Colts. The team was also affected by the loss of defensive end J. J. Watt, who for the second consecutive season was lost early, this time after suffering an injury in Week 5.

This was also the last full season under the ownership of Bob McNair, who died during the 2018 season.

Draft

Notes 
 The Texans acquired a fourth-round compensatory selection (No. 142 overall) from the Cleveland Browns in exchange for Houston's sixth-round selection (No. 188 overall), 2018 second-round selection, and quarterback Brock Osweiler.
 The Texans acquired an additional sixth-round selection (No. 188 overall) in a trade that sent tight end Khari Lee to the Chicago Bears.
 The Texans traded their original sixth-round selection (No. 209 overall), along with their first-round selection in 2016 (22nd) to the Washington Redskins in exchange for the Redskins' first-round selection in 2016 (21st).

Coaching changes
On January 16, the Texans and offensive coordinator George Godsey mutually parted ways after the team finished 29th in total yards for the 2016 season. Two days later the Texans announced that defensive coordinator Romeo Crennel had been promoted to assistant head coach while linebackers coach Mike Vrabel would become the team's new defensive coordinator. On January 31, it was announced that Wes Welker had been hired as an offensive/special teams assistant coach for the Texans.

Staff

Final roster

Preseason

Regular season

Schedule
{| class="wikitable" style="text-align:center"
! style=""| Week
! style=""| Date
! style=""| Opponent
! style=""| Result
! style=""| Record
! style=""| Venue
! style=""| Recap
|-style="background:#fcc"
! 1
| September 10
| Jacksonville Jaguars
| L 7–29
| 0–1
| NRG Stadium
| Recap
|-style="background:#cfc"
! 2
| 
| at Cincinnati Bengals
| W 13–9
| 1–1
| Paul Brown Stadium
| Recap
|-style="background:#fcc"
! 3
| September 24
| at New England Patriots
| L 33–36
| 1–2
| Gillette Stadium
| Recap
|-style="background:#cfc"
! 4
| October 1
| Tennessee Titans
| W 57–14
| 2–2
| NRG Stadium
| Recap
|-style="background:#fcc"
! 5
| October 8
| Kansas City Chiefs
| L 34–42
| 2–3
| NRG Stadium
| Recap
|-style="background:#cfc"
! 6
| October 15
| Cleveland Browns
| W 33–17
| 3–3
| NRG Stadium
| Recap
|-
! 7
| colspan="6" |Bye
|-style="background:#fcc"
! 8
| October 29
| at Seattle Seahawks
| L 38–41
| 3–4
| CenturyLink Field
| Recap
|-style="background:#fcc"
! 9
| November 5
| Indianapolis Colts
| L 14–20
| 3–5
| NRG Stadium
| Recap
|-style="background:#fcc"
! 10
| November 12
| at Los Angeles Rams
| L 7–33
| 3–6
| Los Angeles Memorial Coliseum
| Recap
|-style="background:#cfc"
! 11
| November 19
| Arizona Cardinals
| W 31–21
| 4–6
| NRG Stadium
| Recap
|-style="background:#fcc"
! 12
| 
| at Baltimore Ravens
| L 16–23
| 4–7
| M&T Bank Stadium
| Recap
|-style="background:#fcc"
! 13
| December 3
| at Tennessee Titans
| L 13–24
| 4–8
| Nissan Stadium
| Recap
|-style="background:#fcc"
! 14
| December 10
| San Francisco 49ers
| L 16–26| 4–9
| NRG Stadium
| Recap
|-style="background:#fcc"
! 15
| December 17
| at Jacksonville Jaguars| L 7–45
| 4–10
| EverBank Field
| Recap
|-style="background:#fcc"
! 16
| December 25
| Pittsburgh Steelers
| L 6–34
| 4–11
| NRG Stadium
| Recap
|-style="background:#fcc"
! 17
| December 31
| at Indianapolis Colts|  L 13–22
| 4–12
| Lucas Oil Stadium
| Recap
|}Note: Intra-division opponents are in bold text.

Game summaries

Week 1: vs. Jacksonville Jaguars

The Texans' offensive line played poorly in the game, giving up a total of 10 sacks. Tom Savage started at quarterback for Houston and was sacked 6 times for a total loss of 33 yards. Savage was benched at halftime, finishing the game 7/13 with 62 yards and fumbled twice. Rookie quarterback Deshaun Watson entered the game in the second half and ended the first drive on a 4-yard touchdown pass to DeAndre Hopkins. Watson didn't fare much better behind the poor offensive line play, being sacked 4 times for a total loss of 21 yards with one fumble. Watson finished the game 12/23 for 102 yards with one touchdown and an interception along with 2 rushes for 16 yards.

Linebacker Brian Cushing was suspended 10 games without pay following the game for violating the NFL's PED policy.

Week 2: at Cincinnati Bengals

Deshaun Watson started his first NFL game for the Texans against the Bengals on Thursday Night Football. Watson scored the team's only touchdown of the game on a 49-yard run while the Bengals failed to score a touchdown.

Week 3: at New England Patriots
Trying to get their first ever win in New England and only their second ever win against the Patriots, the Texans led 33-28 with 2:28 remaining, but Tom Brady threw the game winning touchdown to Brandin Cooks with 23 seconds remaining. With the loss, the Texans fell to 1-2. They also fell to 1-9 all time against the Patriots, and 0-6 against them in Foxborough.

Week 4: vs. Tennessee Titans

The Texans never punted during the first half, with four drives ending in a touchdown and one in a 50-yard field goal from Ka'imi Fairbairn. On Houston's last possession of the half, a Deshaun Watson pass was intercepted by Kevin Byard. Andre Hal intercepted two Marcus Mariota passes during the half. The Texans' first punt came on their second possession of the second half, with 3:27 left in the 3rd quarter. The 30 points scored in the first half are the second most in franchise history. Houston defeated Tennessee by a score of 57–14, the most points scored in a single game in franchise history.

Week 5: vs. Kansas City Chiefs

Coming back from a blowout win against Tennessee, the Texans went to face an undefeated Chiefs team. However, tragedy struck when DE J. J. Watt  suffered a season ending leg injury in the first quarter that was later revealed to be a tribal plateau fracture to his left leg. OLB Whitney Mercilus also suffered a season ending  pectoral injury.  Taking advantage of the Watt injury, the Chiefs jumped out to a 16-0 lead 26 minutes into the game. Houston came within 6 points of the lead early in the fourth quarter, but the Texans defense could not keep up with the Chiefs offense. The Chiefs won by 8 points and the Texans fell to 2-3 on the season.

Watt and Mercilus ended up having a major impact on the team, the team going 2-10 without them (including the Chiefs game) and 2-2 with them.

Week 6: vs. Cleveland Browns

The Texans started the year 3-3, however this was their high point of the season. They suffered another major injury in week 9 and went 1-9 from week 7 onwards.

Week 8: at Seattle Seahawks

Week 9: vs. Indianapolis Colts

The Texans suffered a serious blow when quarterback Deshaun Watson tore his ACL during practice and was lost for the season. Tom Savage was named the starter for Houston with T. J. Yates and Matt McGloin being signed as backups.

The Texans only had 96 yards of total offense in the first half with Savage completing 7 passes on 19 attempts for 76 yards. The Colts scored on their first drive with Jacoby Brissett finding T. Y. Hilton for a 45-yard touchdown pass. In the 2nd quarter, Houston kicker Ka'imi Fairbairn missed his first field goal of the season on a 39-yard attempt. The Texans got their first score after Eddie Pleasant sacked Brissett at the Indianapolis 34 yard line. Brissett fumbled the football on the sack with it being recovered by Lamarr Houston who returned it 34 yards for a touchdown. The first half ended with Brissett being sacked by Pleasant again for a loss of 6 yards and a -1 yard run from Frank Gore. Savage threw his first NFL touchdown pass on a 34-yard pass to DeAndre Hopkins in the 4th quarter.

Note: In the third quarter, the Sutherland Springs church shootings happened during a commercial break in which CBS cut to a special news report during the commercial break. Greg Gumbel, after the commercial break, said a prayer before Indianapolis kicked off after scoring.

Week 10: at Los Angeles Rams

Week 11: vs. Arizona Cardinals

After struggling for the past 2 weeks, the Texans' offense improved against the Cardinals, scoring 4 touchdowns. Tom Savage threw 2 touchdowns in the game: a 7-yard pass to Lamar Miller in the 1st quarter and a 28-yard pass to DeAndre Hopkins in the 3rd quarter. Rookie running back D'Onta Foreman rushed for 2 touchdowns on a 3-yard run and a 34-yard run. Foreman was carted off the field after his 2nd touchdown with a lower leg injury.

Savage turned the ball over twice in the game, fumbling after being sacked by Budda Baker and throwing an interception to Patrick Peterson. Arizona scored a touchdown following both Houston turnovers. Blaine Gabbert threw 2 interceptions: one to Eddie Pleasant and one to Andre Hal.

Week 12: at Baltimore Ravens

Week 13: at Tennessee Titans

Week 14: vs. San Francisco 49ersBattle Red DayTom Savage left the game in the 2nd quarter with a concussion. Savage took a hard hit from Elvis Dumervil and his hands were visibly shaking and had trouble rolling over on his side. After throwing two incomplete passes on the ensuing drive, Savage was further evaluated and taken into the locker room. Savage's return was heavily criticized by fans, media members, and concussion experts, including Chris Nowinski. Savage finished the game 6-of-12 for 63 yards. T. J. Yates came in at quarterback on the Texans' next drive, leading a 9 play, 75 yard touchdown drive, ending with a 7-yard pass to DeAndre Hopkins.

With the loss, the Texans fell to 4–9, ensuring their first losing season under head coach Bill O'Brien. Houston was eliminated from playoff contention the following day after the Miami Dolphins defeated the New England Patriots.

Week 15: at Jacksonville Jaguars

With another blowout loss to the Jaguars, the Texans were swept by Jacksonville for the first time since 2013 and fell to 4–10.

Week 16: vs. Pittsburgh SteelersNFL on Christmas DayWeek 17: at Indianapolis Colts

This is the Texans’ first loss in the Bill O'Brien era when they had a lead at halftime. They finished 4-12.

Standings

Division

Conference

Statistics

Team

IndividualSource''':

References

External links
 

Houston
Houston Texans seasons
Houston Texans